Rejinagar is a railway station of the Sealdah-Lalgola line in the Eastern Railway zone. The station is situated at Rejinagar, Beldanga II CD Block in Murshidabad district in the Indian state of West Bengal. It serves Rejinagar and the surrounding areas. Lalgola Passengers and EMU pass through the station.

Electrification
The Krishnanagar– section, including Rejinagar railway station was electrified in 2004. In 2010 the line became double tracked.

References

Railway stations in Murshidabad district
Sealdah railway division
Kolkata Suburban Railway stations